New York City's 1st City Council district is one of 51 districts in the New York City Council. It is currently represented by Democrat Christopher Marte, who took office in 2022.

Geography
District 1 is based in the farthest southern neighborhoods of Manhattan, covering the Financial District, Chinatown, Tribeca, SoHo, Battery Park City, Civic Center, Little Italy, NoHo, and part of the Lower East Side. Also in the district are Governors Island, Ellis Island, Liberty Island, Washington Square Park, City Hall, and the World Trade Center.

The district overlaps with Manhattan Community Boards 1, 2, and 3, and with New York's 7th, 10th, and 12th congressional districts. It also overlaps with the 26th and 27th districts of the New York State Senate, and with the 65th and 66th districts of the New York State Assembly.

With New York's original Chinatown making up a significant portion of its population, the district has a higher proportion of Asian Americans than any other district in Manhattan. When she was elected in 2009, Chin became the first Asian American woman to serve on the City Council, and remains one of only two Asian American members in the body.

Recent election results

2021
In 2019, voters in New York City approved Ballot Question 1, which implemented ranked-choice voting in all local elections. Under the new system, voters have the option to rank up to five candidates for every local office. Voters whose first-choice candidates fare poorly will have their votes redistributed to other candidates in their ranking until one candidate surpasses the 50 percent threshold. If one candidate surpasses 50 percent in first-choice votes, then ranked-choice tabulations will not occur.

}}

2017

2013

History

New York City was divided into wards in 1683; all of the wards were located in what is now the 1st district, and each ward except for the "Out" Ward had the entirety of its territory in the modern-day 1st district. Wards were given numbers in 1791, and the previous "South" Ward was given the 1st ward number. By 1808 the 1st ward had expanded to encompass all of Manhattan south of Maiden Lane.

By the middle of the 19th century wards no longer elected aldermen or other municipal representatives, who were elected instead by Assembly district. Upon consolidation in 1898, a bicameral Municipal Assembly was installed wherein the upper Council elected members from specialized districts and the lower Board of Aldermen continued to elect its membership from State Assembly districts. This arrangement proved to be short-lived, however, as a unicameral Board of Aldermen was established in its place in 1902. This Board had districts that usually but not always corresponded to Assembly districts; throughout this time the 1st aldermanic district was coterminous with New York County's 1st Assembly district. These districts were abolished in 1938 in favor of borough-wide proportional representation, but were restored in 1947 to prevent Communist council members from being elected.

Previous councilmembers
 Martin F. Tanahey (1922–1930)
 Proportional representation (1938–1947)
 Saul Sharison (1965–1974)
 Anthony Gaeta (1974–1977)
 Nicholas LaPorte (1977–1985)
 Frank Fossella (1985)
 Susan Molinari (1986–1990)
 Alfred Cerullo (1990–1991)
 Kathryn E. Freed (1991–2002)
 Alan Gerson (2002–2010)
 Margaret Chin (2010–2022)

References

New York City Council districts